The 1983 Stanley Cup Finals was the championship series of the National Hockey League's (NHL) 1982–83 season, and the culmination of the 1983 Stanley Cup playoffs. It was contested by the Campbell Conference champion Edmonton Oilers in their first-ever Finals appearance and the defending Wales Conference and Cup champion New York Islanders, in their fourth consecutive and overall Finals appearance. The Islanders won the best-of-seven series, four games to none, to win their fourth consecutive and overall Stanley Cup championship.

This was the fourth straight Finals of post-1967 expansion teams. The Oilers, a former World Hockey Association (WHA) franchise, stunned NHL loyalists by reaching the Finals just four years after the NHL-WHA merger. The Oilers even had the better record of the two teams, although under the format in place since the previous Finals Edmonton received home ice advantage on account of being the Campbell champion, which at the time received that advantage in odd numbered years.

This is also the most recent time that an NHL team has won the Cup four years in a row, and also the first (and, to date, only) time a North American professional sports team has won four consecutive titles in any league competition with more than twenty teams. Even if this standard is lowered to encompass league competitions of at least sixteen teams, the Islanders are still only the third and most recent franchise to accomplish such a dynasty after the New York Yankees in Major League Baseball (who have forged two such World Series dynasties - the first in the 1930s and the second in the 1950s) and the Montreal Canadiens (whose own such dynasty immediately preceded the Islanders' prior to the merger with the WHA).

This was the second of nine consecutive Finals contested by a team from Western Canada and was the first of eight consecutive Finals contested by a team from Alberta (of which the Oilers played in six, the Calgary Flames in two, and the Vancouver Canucks in one).

The Oilers would credit the Islanders' subdued post-series locker room celebration—focused more on putting ice packs on their various injuries—as teaching them the level of sacrifice and dedication needed to be champions. The Oilers would go on to win four Stanley Cups in the next five seasons—and five overall by 1990.

The 1983 Finals was the only time between 1982 and  that the Stanley Cup wasn't presented in Western Canada.

Paths to the Finals

Edmonton defeated the Winnipeg Jets 3–0, the Calgary Flames 4–1, and the Chicago Black Hawks 4–0 to advance to the Finals. In eliminating Winnipeg, Calgary, and Chicago, the Oilers had won 11 of 12 games and had outscored their opponents 74–33, averaging over six goals a game and setting 16 scoring records in these three rounds. The 1983 Finals marked sixty years since an Edmonton team had last contested the Stanley Cup. The 1923 Edmonton Eskimos WCHL team played the NHL's Ottawa Senators in the 1923 Stanley Cup Finals, held in Vancouver. Ottawa won the two-game, total-goals series.

New York defeated the Washington Capitals 3–1, the New York Rangers 4–2, and the Boston Bruins 4–2 to reach the Finals.

Game summaries
Billy Smith limited the Oilers to just six goals in the four games, and shut them out in seven out of twelve periods. Smith was also noted for his slashes and feigned injuries in that series, which made him unpopular with the Edmonton Journal, which named him "PUBLIC ENEMY NO. 1", "Mr. Obnoxious", "Samaurai [sic] Billy", "Jack the Ripper" and "a creep". After a slash on Glenn Anderson's knee prevented him from practicing the next day, Oilers manager and coach Glen Sather unsuccessfully complained to the NHL that Smith deserved an attempt-to-injure match penalty, and then took his case to the press, suggesting that the Oilers could take out Smith. Smith responded, "Let's face it. If Semenko runs at me and hurts me, anything could happen, and the victim could be Gretzky. If they want blood.…" Smith did, however, earn a five-minute penalty for slashing Wayne Gretzky.
In game four, Smith's dive resulted in referee Andy Van Hellemond giving Anderson a five-minute penalty.

In his first appearance in the Finals, Gretzky assisted on four of the Oilers' six goals but failed to score himself. While no Islander was assigned to mark Gretzky, the Oilers superstar found himself checked as soon as he got the puck. The Islanders' tactics were described as a "rope-a-dope", using their experience and patience to hang on in the face of the Oilers' furious attack. The Islanders permitted Edmonton to take long shots from poor angles, but cleared the rebounds and kept the front of the net open so Smith could see. The Sutter brothers, Duane and Brent, led with seven and five points, respectively in the first three games. Duane played a particularly important role in the absence of Bossy in game one. Bossy netted his second Stanley Cup-winning goal.

After game four, the Oilers players walked past the Islanders' dressing room and noticed many of the Islanders players exhausted and covered in ice packs rather than wildly celebrating, with Wayne Gretzky suggesting that this gave the Oilers inspiration that they needed in order to win next year.

Game Summary

Billy Smith won the Conn Smythe Trophy as playoff MVP.

Broadcasting
The series aired on CBC in Canada and on the USA Network in the United States. USA's national coverage was blacked out in the New York area due to the local rights to Islanders games in that TV market, with WOR televising games one and two, and SportsChannel New York airing games three and four.

Team rosters

Edmonton Oilers

|}

New York Islanders

|}

Stanley Cup engraving
The 1983 Stanley Cup was presented to Islanders captain Denis Potvin by NHL President John Ziegler following the Islanders 4–2 win over the Oilers in game four.

The following Islanders players and staff had their names engraved on the Stanley Cup

1982–83 New York Islanders

Members of New York Islanders 1980 to 1983 Dynasty
These players and personnel (22 in all) won four Stanley Cups as members of the Islanders, and would also be a part of the Islanders in the 1984 Stanley Cup Finals. The Islanders amassed an NHL record of 19 straight playoff series wins and again reach the Stanley Cup Finals, but lost the 1984 Finals to the Edmonton Oilers in a rematch of the 1983 series.
Players: Mike Bossy, Bob Bourne, Clark Gillies, Butch Goring, Lorne Henning†, Anders Kallur, Gord Lane, Dave Langevin, Wayne Merrick, Ken Morrow, Bob Nystrom, Stefan Persson, Denis Potvin, Billy Smith, Duane Sutter, John Tonelli, Bryan Trottier
Non-playing personnel: John Pickett (owner), Bill Torrey (general manager), Al Arbour (head coach), Gerry Ehman (Scout/later Assistant Manager), Jim Pickard, Ron Waske (Trainers) Lorne Henning†,
† – Henning was a player on the 1980 team, a player-assistant coach on the 1981 team, and an assistant coach on the 1982 and 1983 teams. Henning assisted on 1980 Stanley Cup winning goal in overtime.

See also
 List of Stanley Cup champions
 1982–83 NHL season

References

 
 

 
Stanley
Stanley Cup Finals
Edmonton Oilers games
New York Islanders games
May 1983 sports events in North America
Ice hockey competitions in Edmonton
1980s in Edmonton
Sports competitions in New York (state)
1983 in sports in New York (state)
1983 in Alberta
1983 in Canadian sports